Bukidnon may be any of several Philippine languages:

Binukid language
Sulod language
Magahat language
Karolanos language

See also
Western Bukidnon language